Velázquez is a crater on Mercury. Its name was adopted by the International Astronomical Union (IAU) in 1979. Velázquez is named for the Spanish painter Diego Velázquez.

Hollows
Hollows are present on and around the central peak complex of Velázquez crater.  They were well-imaged by MESSENGER.

References

Impact craters on Mercury